The music articles in Rees's Cyclopaedia were written by Charles Burney (1726–1814), with additional material by John Farey Sr. (1766–1826), and John Farey Jr. (1791–1851), and illustrated by 53 plates as well a numerous examples of music typset within the articles.

Charles Burney was well known as the author of a General History of Music, 4 vol 1776–1789 and two travel diaries recording his musical tours collecting information in France and Italy, and later Germany, 1+2 vol, 1771 and 1773, as well as the Commemoration of Handel, 1785 and his Musical Memoirs of Metastasio, 1796. John Farey Sr. was a polymath, well known today for his work as a geologist and for his investigations of the mathematics of sound, and the schemes of tempermant used in tuning musical instruments then. His son, John Farey Jr., was also polymathic in his interests. He contributed numerous drawings for the illustrations of mostly technological and scientific topics in Rees's Cyclopaedia.

Burney's music biographies range from antiquity to the first decade of the nineteenth century. He wrote 756 articles, and while great number of the names, such as Mozart, were featured in his earlier writings,  others are unique to the Cyclopaedia. These mainly concern minor London musicians and singers, whom Burney had known personally in his young days. Some are known through modern reference books, but others, often with only surname, only have their memory recorded in the pages of the Cyclopaedia. In a few cases Burney has anglicised Christian names — John Frederick Reichardt, instead of Johann Friedrich, for example.

In his biographies Burney mirrored the Lives of the Poets by Samuel Johnson, namely: a short summary of the subject's reputation, with a summary of his career, a list of his works and an account of his genius and his contribution to music.

Lonsdale has commented that a handful of Burney biographical articles are misplaced in the alphabetical sequence. These occur mostly under the letter A, and were missed in the early stages of writing, when Burney was trying to overtake the press, for he did not start composing the texts until the summer of 1801, when the work was already underway. One, Jacques Arkadelt in Vol 2, appears twice, as Giacomo Arkadelt in Vol, 16 where he is listed in the middle of the Gs, but with a shorter article.

Alphabetisation of articles

The work followed the then common practice of conflating the letters I and J and U and V into single sequences. The topics included in this list therefore follow the sequence they appear in the original volumes.

Annotation

The articles are annotated to Mercer's edition of Burney's History (1935) and Scholes's edition of Burney's Travels (1959). Where a page reference is given the text can be found there. Where a book is cited, but with no page, index entries were found, and Burney is presumed to have written his article using the information there. Where there is no annotation, the article must be unique to the Cyclopaedia

Vol 1 A-Amarathides

Vol 2 Amarantus-Arteriotomy

Vol 3 Artery-Battersea

Vol 4 Battery-Bookbinding

Vol 5 Book-keeping-Calvart

Vol 6 Calvary-Castra

Vol 7 Castramentation-Chronology

Vol 8 Chronometer-Colliseum

Vol 9 Collision-Corne

Vol 10 Cornea-Czyrcassy

Vol 11 D-Dissimilitude

Vol 12 Dissimulation-Eloane

Vol 13 Elocution-Extremities

Vol 14 Extrinsic-Food (part)

Vol 15 Food(part)-Generation (part)

Vol 16 Generation (part)- Gretna

Vol 17 Gretry-Hebe

Vol 18 Hibiscus-Increment

Vol 19 Increments-Kilmes

Vol 20 Kiln-Light

Vol 21 Lighthouse-Machinery (part)

Vol 22 Machinery(part)-Mattheson

Vol 23 Matthew-Monsoon

Vol 24 Monster - Newton-in-the-Willows

Vol 25 Newtonian Philosophy-Ozunusze

Vol 26 P-Perturbation

Vol 27 Pertussis-Poetics

Vol 28 Poetry-Punjoor

Vol 29 Punishment-Repton

Vol 30 Republic-Rzemien

Vol 31 S-Scotium

Vol 32 Scotland-Sindy

Vol 33 Sines-Starboard

Vol 34 Starch-Szydlow

Vol 35 T-Toleration

Vol 36 Tol-Ver

Vol 37 Vermes-Waterloo

Vol 38 Water-Wzetin

Vol 39 X-Zytomiers with Addenda

Notes

Music-related lists
Lists of reference books
Biographies